Makov is a village and municipality in northern Slovakia. Makov or Maqov may also refer to
ŠK Javorník Makov, a Slovak association football club based in Makov
Maqov, a village and municipality in Azerbaijan
Makov (Blansko District), a village and municipality in the Czech Republic
Makov (Svitavy District), a village and municipality in the Czech Republic
Makov Hrib, a village in Croatia

See also 
Maków (disambiguation)